Agonopterix grammatopa is a moth in the family Depressariidae. It was described by Edward Meyrick in 1920. It is found in South Africa.

The wingspan is about 18 mm. The forewings are light brownish sprinkled with fuscous, with an extremely oblique black dash and a cloudy blackish dot. The hindwings are pale greyish, the veins suffusedly darker.

References

Endemic moths of South Africa
Moths described in 1920
Agonopterix
Moths of Africa